Iron(IV) oxytetrafluoroborate is a chemical compound with the rare Fe(IV) ion. It was first reported in 1998 but was not confirmed. Then in 2006, a more reliable production was reported. It was created by reacting iron(II) tetrafluoroborate with ozone. The compound is very unstable, some of the product was quickly decomposed with the leftover Fe(II) to create iron(III) tetrafluoroborate and Fe(IV) complexes. It is also decomposed by various oxygen acceptors such as sulfur which creates sulfur monoxide and iron(II) tetrafluoroborate.

References

External links

Iron compounds
Oxycations
Tetrafluoroborates